Acacia gemina is a shrub or tree of the genus Acacia and the subgenus Plurinerves that is endemic to an area of south western Australia.

Description
Like most species of Acacia it has phyllodes rather than true leaves. The evergreen, patent to inclined phyllodes have a narrowly oblong to oblong-oblanceolate shape and are straight or slightly recurved.

Distribution
It is native to an area in the Peel and Wheatbelt  region of Western Australia where it is commonly situated on scree slopes and along gullies and creeks growing in gravelly soils often containing laterite and in areas composed of sandstone. The shrub has a distribution from around Brookton in the Boyagin Rock Reserve in the north down to around the Saddleback Timber Reserve close to Boddington in the south a couple of outlying populations, one near Hyden and the other around Narrogin where it is found as a part of low woodland communities where it is associated with Eucalyptus drummondii or open heathland communities often dominated by Dryandra carduacea.

See also
 List of Acacia species

References

gemina
Acacias of Western Australia
Taxa named by Bruce Maslin
Plants described in 1999